Fátima Djarra Sani (born 1968) is a Guinea-Bissau feminist activist concerned with visibility of African women and preventing female genital mutilation (FGM).

Early life
Fátima Djarra Sani was born in Bissau, the country's capital, in 1968. She is an activist against the genital mutilation of women in Guinea-Bissau and represents Médecins du Monde in Africa.

Her family comes from the Mandinga ethnic group. She suffered genital mutilation when she was four years old.

Career
In 2008, she joined Médecins du Monde, and has organized workshops and lectures on the visibility of African women, and has been working on projects on sexual reproductive health and the prevention of genital mutilation.

She participated in the drafting of a protocol for the prevention and action against female genital mutilation that was approved in June 2013 in Navarra in Spain.

In 2020 she was part of a team that presented the work that had been done in Navarra in the previous year. Over 200 interventions had been made in Navarra's African community. This included both men and women as there was a growing realisation that men too needed to be persuaded as they can be the power for change.

Writing
In 2015 she published Indomable: de la mutilación a la vida (Indomitable: From Mutilation to Life), with the Ediciones Península Publishing House, an autobiography, in which she tells her life story.

Publications
 Indomable: de la mutilación a la vida (Indomitable: from mutilation to life), Ediciones Península, 2015

References

1968 births
Living people
Bissau-Guinean women
Bissau-Guinean health activists
People from Bissau
Activists against female genital mutilation
Mandé people
Violence against women in Guinea-Bissau